The discography of Mötley Crüe, an American heavy metal band, consists of nine studio albums, three live albums, three EPs, six compilation albums, two box sets, nine DVD, 30 singles, and 32 music videos.

Mötley Crüe was formed in 1981 by bass guitarist Nikki Sixx and drummer Tommy Lee, who were later joined by lead guitarist Mick Mars and lead singer Vince Neil. Mötley Crüe has sold more than 100 million albums worldwide, including 25 million in the US.

The band members have often been noted for their hard-living lifestyles; all members have had numerous brushes with the law, have spent time in jail and have suffered long addictions to alcohol and drugs. Their ninth studio album entitled Saints of Los Angeles was released on June 24, 2008. The band announced their retirement in 2013 and played what was planned to be their final concert on December 31, 2015. In 2019, the band officially reunited.

Studio albums

Live albums

Compilation albums

Box sets

Extended plays

Singles

Other appearances

Video albums

Music videos

References 

Discography
Discographies of American artists
Rock music group discographies